= Joy Osifo =

Nigerian entrepreneur

Princess Joy Osifo
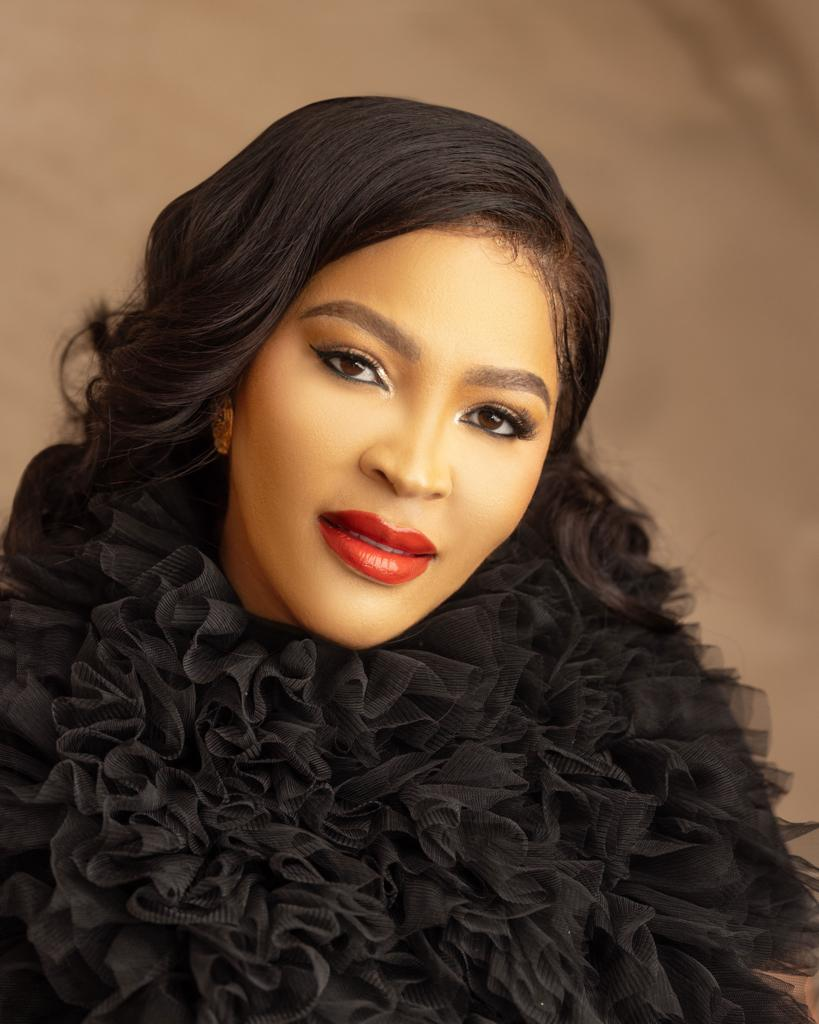
- Born: Joy Osifo; June 10, 1981 (age 44); Warri, Delta State
- Organization: JENIKS Group
- Parent(s): Elder David and Deaconess Elizabeth Elizabeth
- Website: www.princessosifo.com

Princess Joy Osifo (born June 10, 1981) is a Nigerian businesswoman and entrepreneur, popularly known as the "Queen of Oil and Gas" for her contributions to the oil and gas industry.

She is the President/Founder of JENIKS Group and the Princess Foundation (The Helping Hands Home).

== Early life and education ==
Princess Joy Osifo studied law and worked as a banker for a few years before rising to a managerial position in two Nigerian banks in Abuja and Port Harcourt.

She was mentored by one of Nigeria's top bankers, known for his intelligence and strict adherence to business rules. She also obtained a Master of Business Administration degree in Business Law and completed professional courses at Harvard and in Cyprus.

== Awards and nominations ==
- TALF’s Life-Changing Icon of the Year (2022).
- Trailblazer in Energy Excellence.

== Jeniks Group ==
Founded in 2011, Jeniks Energy Group has been a significant player in the oil and gas industry. The group has key hubs in Ghana, Kenya, and Dubai, and recently expanded its strategic partnership with a global gas investment firm, securing representation for Qatar's gas reserves in Africa.

== Career ==
After studying law, Princess Osifo transitioned into banking, where she rose to managerial positions in two Nigerian banks. She eventually left banking to establish Jeniks Group, an oil and gas company.

== Philanthropy ==
Princess Osifo founded the Princess Foundation (The Helping Hands Home) to provide scholarships and skills acquisition training for children. Since its establishment in 2017, the foundation has helped over 1,000 children. The foundation also cares for the elderly and has trained nearly 1,100 people in various fields.
